The Steubenville City School District is a public school district based in Steubenville, Jefferson County, Ohio, United States.

Schools
Steubenville High School
Harding Middle School
Garfield East Elementary School
Wells Elementary School
West Pugliese Elementary School

Steubenville High School rape case

District superintendent Michael McVey and some other district employees have been charged with crimes including obstructing justice in the aftermath of the 2012 rape of a female student by students of Steubenville High School.

See also
List of school districts in Ohio

References

External links

Steubenville, Ohio
Education in Jefferson County, Ohio
School districts in Ohio